Boyana may refer to:

People
 Boyana (given name), a common Bulgarian given name
 Bojana (disambiguation), variations of a common Slavic given name spelled as Boyana in Bulgarian

Places
Boyana, neighbourhood of the Bulgarian capital of Sofia
Boyana Church, medieval Bulgarian Orthodox church situated in the Boyana neighbourhood	
Boyana Glacier on Livingston Island in the South Shetland Islands, Antarctica, which is named for Boyana neighbourhood.

See also
 Boyan (disambiguation)